Maxted is an English locational surname from a no longer in existence village. Another theory is that is from Maxstoke, Warwickshire, England.

Notable people with this surname
Anna Maxted, author
Billy Maxted, American jazz pianist
Adam Maxted, British reality TV contestant

References

English toponymic surnames